Cedarville High School is a public high school in Cedarville, Ohio.  It is the only high school in the Cedar Cliff Local School District. Some notable things the school has accomplished recently are the cross country team qualifying for the state meet in 2018 and also 2019.

External links
 https://web.archive.org/web/20100128234006/http://www.cedarcliffschools.org/hs_home.htm

Notes and references

High schools in Greene County, Ohio
Public high schools in Ohio